There are multiple institutions called the College of Islamic and Arabic Studies or the Institute of Islamic and Arabic Studies:
 Institute of Islamic and Arabic Studies (Dubai)
 Pontifical Institute of Arab and Islamic Studies, in Rome
 College of Islamic and Arabic Studies, Afghanistan, American intelligence analysts characterize this as a jihadist safe house
 Institute for Islamic Studies at the University of Toronto